The Buffalo Soldier Monument by Eddie Dixon was installed at the United States Military Academy in West Point, New York, in 2021.

References

2021 establishments in New York (state)
2021 sculptures
Black people in art
Buffalo Soldiers
Equestrian statues in New York (state)
Monuments and memorials at West Point
Outdoor sculptures in New York (state)